State of the art often refers to the highest level of development of a device, technique, or scientific field, achieved at a particular time.

State of the art may also refer to:
 State of the art, a patent law concept, which is a synonym of prior art
 The State of the Art, a collection of short fiction by Iain M. Banks
 State of the Art (demo), an Amiga computer demo
 State of the Art (book), a book by American film critic Pauline Kael
 State of the Art (Shinhwa album), a 2006 album by Shinhwa
 State of the Art (Hilltop Hoods album), a 2009 album by Hilltop Hoods
State of the Art (Jimmy McGriff album), a 1985 album by jazz organist Jimmy McGriff
 State of the Art (Presto album)
 "State of the Art", the eighth track on the album Making Mirrors by Gotye
 "State of the Art" (Sliders), an episode of the television series Sliders